The Turiia is a river in Volyn Oblast, Ukraine. It is a right tributary of the Pripyat.

References

Rivers of Volyn Oblast